Club Deportivo Racing Junior de Armenia  is a Salvadoran professional football club based in Armenia, Sonsonate, El Salvador.

The club currently plays in the Segunda División de Fútbol Salvadoreño.

History
On 1951, a group of Armenia citizens decided to form a team which represented their community passion for football. The club started out as San Juan, before being named Club Deportivo Obrero, the club was soon renamed in honor of Racing, a famous Argentine football club.
After changing name they won their first title in 1953, being promoted to Liga B (currently known as Tercera Division), for the next two decades the club would remain in the division, however in 1970, the club defeated local team Club Leones to be promoted to the Liga de Ascenso (currently known as Segunda Division). The club came close to promotion to the primera division in 1983 and 1985, however they were defeated on both occasion by Chalatenango and Dragon respectively. 
The club would be demoted to Tercera Division, In 2012, Racing Jr got revenge on Chalatenango by winning the playoff match.

They currently play in the segunda division.

Stadium
The club plays its home games at the Estadio 21 de Noviembre located at Armenia, Sonsonate, with a capacity of 2,329 seats.

Honours

Domestic honours

Leagues
 Primera División Salvadorean and predecessors 
 Champions : N/A
 Segunda División Salvadorean and predecessors 
 Champions  : N/A
 Runners-up (2): 1983, 1985
 Tercera División Salvadorean and predecessors 
 Champions (2) : 1973, 2012
 Play-off winner (2): 2013 ,2016

Current squad
As of:

Notable players

Internationals who have played at Racing
 Jorge Búcaro
 Mauricio Cienfuegos

Coaches
  Arnoldo Carios (1977)
  Cristo Arnoldo Velásquez Farfán (1991)
  Cristo Arnoldo Velásquez Farfán (2005)
  Borís Romero (2012)
 Jorge Búcaro (2014)
  Elmer Guidos (2016–2017)
  Enzo Artiga (2018– June 2018)
   Fausto Omar el Bocho Vásquez (June 2018– March 2019)
  Efren Marenco (March 2019 – October 2019)
  Wilber Aguilar (October 2019 - March 2020)
 Hiatus (March 2020 - May 2021)
  Jaime Medina (June 2021- December 2021)
  Angel Orellana (December 2021 - June 2022)
  William Osorio (June 2022-Present)

External links
  

Racing Junior